Henry Bromley was the pseudonym of Anthony Wilson (1750?–1814?). He was an English writer on art and author of the Catalogue of Engraved Portraits.

Biography
Anthony Wilson, better known by his pseudonym Henry Bromley, was born at Wigan in 1750. He was perhaps connected with the Wilson family of Kendal, which intermarried with that of Bromley. Wilson belonged to a mercantile firm in the city of London, and was a regular attendant at Hutchins's auction-rooms, where he was detected on one occasion abstracting prints. He also frequented the sale-room of Nathaniel Smith, father of the antiquary, John Thomas Smith (1766–1833). The date of Wilson's death is unknown. His portrait was engraved by Barrett.

Works
In 1793, stimulated by the increased demand for prints consequent on the publication of James Granger's Biographical History of England (1769), Wilson, under the name of Henry Bromley, published A Catalogue of Engraved British Portraits (London, 4to). He received assistance in the compilation from many leading antiquaries and virtuosi, including Sir William Musgrave, James Bindley, and Anthony Morris Storer. In the Catalogue Wilson aimed at furnishing a complete list of engraved British portraits, neglecting only those which could not be identified with their originals. He divided his list into historic periods, and subdivided it into groups according to the rank or calling of the persons portrayed. There is a copy in the British Library. Edward Evans (1789–1835), the print-seller, states that he was a contributor to the Gentleman's Magazine (cf. a letter signed ‘A Gothamite,’ in July 1814).

Notes

References

Attribution
 This source cites:
Manuscript note by Evans, the printseller, in his copy of Bromley's Catalogue, afterwards in the possession of Sir George Scharf;
preface to Bromley's Catalogue;
Evans's Catalogue of Engraved Portraits, vol. i. Nos. 1352, 11360;
Redgrave's Dict. of Artists, s.v. ‘Bromley.’

1750 births
1814 deaths
18th-century English non-fiction writers
18th-century English male writers
18th-century English writers
19th-century English non-fiction writers
18th-century English people
English non-fiction writers
English male non-fiction writers
19th-century English male writers